Ballo della Regina is a one-act neoclassical ballet choreographed by George Balanchine to music by Giuseppe Verdi. It is a set of variations set to ballet music (titled La Peregrina) that Verdi cut from Act 3 of the original 1867 version of his  opera Don Carlos.  Its premiere performance was on 12 January 1978, by the New York City Ballet at New York State Theater in Lincoln Center.

The work, which has a length of about 17 minutes, is noted for the high degree of technical difficulties it presents for the female lead. Ballo della Regina was featured in an Emmy-winning PBS performance entitled Balanchine: Dance in America - Ballo della Regina - Steadfast Tin Soldier - Elegie - Tschaikovsky.

Casts

Recordings
In light of the impact of the COVID-19 pandemic on the performing arts, Royal Danish Ballet released a recording starring Holly Dorger and Jonathan Chmelensky. New York City Ballet released a video featuring Megan Fairchild and Anthony Huxley.

References

External links 
Ballo della Regina on the Balanchine Trust website
Extract performed by Holly Dorger

Ballets by George Balanchine
Ballets to the music of Giuseppe Verdi
1978 ballet premieres
New York City Ballet repertory